Prospect is an unincorporated community and census-designated place (CDP) in southern Grant Parish, Louisiana, United States. It is part of the Alexandria, Louisiana Metropolitan Statistical Area. As of the 2010 census the population was 476.

Geography
Prospect is located in southern Grant Parish along U.S. Route 167, which leads north  to Dry Prong and south  to Alexandria.

Demographics

As of the 2010 census, there were 476 people with 170 households, for a population density of 323/sq mi. The racial makeup of the community was 0.63% Black or African American, 95.38% White, 0.63% Native American, 0.42% Asian, and 2.94% from other races.  1.63% of the population were Hispanic or Latino of any race. 50% of the population are male thus the other 50% are female.

The median age of Prospect was 34.6 which is lower than the US median, 37.3. 52.69% of the population are married, 13.26% are divorced. The average household size is 2.79 people. 34.65% of people who have children are married couples while 14.96% who have children are single.

The median home cost was $93,600 with a cost of living at 14.90% and the unemployment rate was 8.60%.

References

http://louisiana.hometownlocator.com/la/grant/prospect.cfm

Census-designated places in Louisiana
Census-designated places in Grant Parish, Louisiana
Census-designated places in Alexandria metropolitan area, Louisiana